Dinamic Motorsport is an Italian auto racing team based in Reggio Emilia, Italy. It is a Porsche reference team and participates in the most important GT car races in the world.

History 
Dinamic Motorsport was born from the will and passion of Maurizio Lusuardi and Giuliano Bottazzi after years of success in Italy with numerous victories in the Porsche Carrera Cup Italia and in the Porsche Supercup, in 2019 the team made its debut in the GT World Challenge Europe as the reference team of the Porsche and he winning the 3 Hours of Monza with his Porsche 911 GT3 R. In 2020 Dinamic Motorsport wins the 6 Hours of Nürburgring and takes third place at the 24 Hours of Spa.

References

External links 

 

Italian auto racing teams

Porsche Supercup teams
ADAC GT Masters teams
Blancpain Endurance Series teams
Porsche in motorsport
International GT Open teams